Bop Girl Goes Calypso is a 1957 American United Artists film directed by Howard W. Koch and starring Judy Tyler. It features calypso music by the Bobby Troup Trio and bassist Jim Aton.

Plot

Working on a thesis, college student Bob Hilton performs research while predicting that calypso music will be the next craze, replacing rock and roll. When he and Professor Winthrop visit a nightclub where Jo Thomas is the featured singer, Jo mocks Bob's theory until he takes her to another club and piques her interest.

Bob's interest in music and in Jo is frustrating to Marion Hendricks, his impatient fiancée. Jo adds a calypso number to her repertoire, causing friction between the club's owner and Bob, resulting in a fight. But the audience's enthusiastic reaction to the song causes the nightclub to be renamed Club Trinidad with a new musical theme. Marion breaks up with Bob but attracts the romantic interest of the professor.

Cast
Judy Tyler as Jo Thomas
Bobby Troup as Robert Hilton
Margo Woode as Marion Hendricks
Lucien Littlefield as Professor Winthrop

See also
 List of American films of 1957

References

External links
 

1957 films
American musical films
Films directed by Howard W. Koch
United Artists films
1957 musical films
1950s English-language films
1950s American films